Ballyfatten, also, Bally Fatten is a cultivar of domesticated apple.

Its origin

Ballyfatten apple originated, in northern Ireland, in 1802, in Ballyfatten, and has long been popular there.

Ballyfatten is a baking apple

Ballyfatten is used in baking, as a cooking apple.

Growing

Flowering time

 On May 13, Ballyfatten is 10% flowering,
 On May 17, Ballyfatten is full flowered, 80%, and,
 On May 24, 90%, of petals have fallen

Pollination

For pollination, Ballyfatten apples needs another apple, of flowering group A, B, or C, or of a group directly above or below.

Picking time

The best time to pick Ballyfatten apples is late September.

References

External links and references

 Some information

Apple cultivars
British apples
Cooking apples